Following is a list of chapters of Sigma Gamma Epsilon. Active chapters are indicated in bold. Inactive chapters are in italics.

Notes

References 

Lists of chapters of United States student societies by society
Honor societies
Professional fraternities and sororities in the United States